Pierre Prat (19 January 1930 – 13 March 2014) was a French middle-distance runner. He competed in the men's 3000 metres steeplechase at the 1952 Summer Olympics.

References

1930 births
2014 deaths
Athletes (track and field) at the 1952 Summer Olympics
French male middle-distance runners
French male steeplechase runners
Olympic athletes of France
Place of birth missing